Wall House may refer to:
(sorted by state, then city/town)

Sollner-Wall House, Tallahassee, Florida, listed on the National Register of Historic Places (NRHP) in Leon County
Wall-Ratzlaff House, Buhler, Kansas, listed on the NRHP in Reno County
Judge T. B. Wall House, Wichita, Kansas, listed on the NRHP in Sedgwick County
Wall House (Clinton, Louisiana), listed on the NRHP in East Feliciana Parish
Comins-Wall House, Southbridge, Massachusetts, NRHP-listed
Wall-Seppanen House, Iron River, Michigan, NRHP-listed
Carlton D. Wall House, Plymouth, Michigan, NRHP-listed
Taylor-Wall-Yancy House, Sardis, Mississippi, listed on the NRHP in Panola County
George Wall House, Durham, North Carolina
George W. Wall House, Wallburg, North Carolina, listed on the NRHP in Davidson County
Wall House (Elkins Park, Pennsylvania), NRHP-listed
B.C. Wall House, North Augusta, South Carolina, NRHP-listed
Adam Wall House, Prices Fork, Virginia, NRHP-listed
Thomas R. Wall Residence, Oshkosh, Wisconsin, listed on the NRHP in Winnebago County